The Americas Zone was one of the three zones of the regional Davis Cup competition in 2016.

In the Americas Zone there were three different tiers, called groups, in which teams competed against each other to advance to the upper tier. Winners in Group III advanced to the Americas Zone Group II in 2017. All other teams remained in Group III.

Participating nations

Inactive nations

These nations decided not to compete in the 2016 Davis Cup.

Draw

Date: 11–16 July 2016

Location: Club de Tenis La Paz, La Paz, Bolivia (clay)

Format: Round-robin basis. Two pools of four and five teams, respectively (Pools A and B). The winner of each pool plays off against the runner-up of the other pool to determine which two nations are promoted to Americas Zone Group II in 2017.

Seeding: The seeding was based on the Davis Cup Rankings of 7 March 2016 (shown in parentheses below).

{| class="wikitable"
!width=25%|Pot 1
!width=25%|Pot 2
!width=25%|Pot 3
!width=25%|Pot 4
|-
|
  (72)
  (78)
|
  (85)
  (88)
|
  (89)
  (91)
|
  (102)
  (114)
  (115)
|}

Group A

Group B

First round

Group A

Jamaica vs. Cuba

Bolivia vs. Panama

Jamaica vs. Panama

Bolivia vs. Cuba

Cuba vs. Panama

Bolivia vs. Jamaica

Group B

Bahamas vs. Honduras

Costa Rica vs. Trinidad and Tobago

Honduras vs. Bermuda

Bahamas vs. Costa Rica

Honduras vs. Trinidad and Tobago

Bahamas vs. Bermuda

Costa Rica vs. Bermuda

Bahamas vs. Trinidad and Tobago

Honduras vs. Costa Rica

Trinidad and Tobago vs. Bermuda

Play-offs

Promotional

Bolivia vs. Costa Rica

Jamaica vs. Bahamas

5th−6th

Cuba vs. Honduras

7th−8th

Panama vs. Bermuda

References

External links
Official Website

Americas Zone Group III
Davis Cup Americas Zone